Interscope Geffen A&M Records (IGA), is an American umbrella label owned by Universal Music Group, consisting of record labels Interscope Records, Geffen Records, and A&M Records.

History
 
Interscope Geffen A&M Records was established in 1999, following the PolyGram and MCA Music Entertainment merger (which created UMG). The label group was created by combining the MCA labels Interscope and Geffen Records with the PolyGram-owned A&M, which, at the time, became dormant. The label operated as one of the newly formed Universal Music Group's four umbrella companies, the other three being The Universal Motown Republic Group, Verve Records and The Island Def Jam Music Group.

As a result of the merger, a significant percentage of artists and bands were dropped from A&M and Geffen, and though both continued to exist as labels, 280 jobs were eliminated and A&M's Charlie Chaplin lot offices were closed.  The reorganization, expected to produce $300 million in savings annually, was described by the Los Angeles Times as underscoring the "changing economics and direction of the music business."

As independent labels, A&M and Geffen were revered and had achieved substantial commercial and artistic success. Both had been sold by their founders, however, and both had suffered from budget restraints and unproductive band signings over the previous years.  At the time of the merger neither label had records in the Billboard Top 40 while Interscope had "defined the new sound of young America" with hit records from artists including Dr. Dre, Snoop Dogg, Tupac Shakur, Nine Inch Nails, No Doubt, Limp Bizkit, and Bush, among others.  Interscope co-founders Jimmy Iovine and Ted Field were named co-chairmen of IGA at its launch.

In 2000, Universal Music Group became the first music corporation to break the $1-billion mark in EBITDA (earnings before interest, taxes, depreciation, and amortization). The company held the top position in music sales with 28.03% market share, and Interscope was the top-selling Universal label, with an 8.97% market share.

In 2003, UMG acquired DreamWorks Records and in 2004 DreamWorks was merged with IGA.  Artists including Blink-182, Papa Roach, Rise Against, Nelly Furtado, Lifehouse, AFI, the All-American Rejects, Jimmy Eat World and Rufus Wainwright were moved to the Geffen and Interscope imprints.

In 2010, IGA and 19 Entertainment announced a strategic alliance to develop, distribute and globally market records by American Idol finalists and winning contestants.  In 2013, it fully acquired Octone Records, which had been established as a joint venture in 2007.

Iovine served as chairman and CEO of IGA until May 2014. He was succeeded by John Janick.

Labels

Geffen Records 
 Cinematic Music Group
 Downtown Records
 Joytime Collective
 Rebel Music
 SpindleHorse Music

Interscope Records 
Shady Records
Aftermath Entertainment
Darkroom
Dreamville Records
Interscope Films
KIDinaKORNER
Mad Love Records
Sosshouse Records
Zone 4 Inc

Defunct 
A&M Records
A&M Octone Records
A&M Records UK (founded in 2008, as an imprint of Polydor UK)
DGC Records
 DreamWorks Records
Fascination Records
Flawless Records
Fiction Records
Kon Live Distribution
MCA Records (later rebranded as MCA Nashville) including catalogs of:
ABC Records
Paramount Records
Gasoline Alley Records
Radioactive Records
Uni Records
Star Trak Entertainment
Tennman Records
Will.i.am Music Group

See also 
 List of record labels
 List of current Interscope Records artists
 List of current Geffen Records artists
 List of current A&M Records artists

References

External links 
 Official Interscope website

American record labels
Interscope Records
A&M Records
Labels distributed by Universal Music Group
Entertainment companies based in California
Companies based in Santa Monica, California
American companies established in 1999
Record labels established in 1999
1999 establishments in California
IFPI members